Red Hills  may refer to:

Places

United States 
 Red Hills (San Luis Obispo County), a mountain range in California
 Red Hills (Tuolumne County), a mountain range in California
 Red Hills (Kansas), a physiographic region 
 Red Hills (Charlottesville, Virginia), a historic home and farm complex
 Red Hills Lake County AVA, California
 Red Hills Region, in Georgia and Florida
 Red Hills State Park, in Illinois
 Red Hills Wind Farm, in Oklahoma
 Red Hills of Dundee, in Oregon

Elsewhere
 Red Hills, Tasmania, Australia
 Red Hills, Chennai, or Sengundram, India
 Red Hills Lake, or Puzhal aeri, Chennai
 Red Hills, Hyderabad, India
 Maibam Lokpa Ching or Red Hills, World War II historical site in Manipur, India
 Red Hills Fissure, Jamaica
 Red Hills or Red Cuillin, a range of hills on Skye, Scotland

See also

 Red Hill (disambiguation)
 Redhill (disambiguation)
 Redhills (disambiguation)
 Red Hills salamander